The Zamboanga National High School West or simply called "West" is a school on R.T Lim Boulevard, Zamboanga City. It was established on June 30, 1986.

Departments
ZNHS West is composed of 8 departments of subjects (excluding Chinese Mandarin under the English Department and Environmental Science under Science Department and STVEP under T.L.E Department).
 Dr. Maria Pilar N. Gregorio, Principal IV
 Mrs. Helen Mangumpit (English Department)
 Dr. Ma. Fe S. Gadaingan (Mathematics Department)
 Mrs. Lourdes Alvarez-Mendoza (T.L.E. Department)
 Mrs. Josephine Almazar (Filipino Department)
 Dr. Nilda Galdones (Araling Panlipunan Department)
 Mr. Ricardo Rosete (MAPEH Department)
 Mrs. Teresita Carbonilla (Values Education Department)
 Mrs. Bonifica Cabaring (Science and Technology Department)

Special programs

Science and Technology and Engineering Mathematics (STEM) is the special program given by the Department of Education to the school which is under the Science Department.

Special Program for Foreign Language (SPFL) is also a special program taught by the school. This foreign language is Chinese Mandarin. It is under the English Department.

STVEP is the new program under the T.L.E. department. It teaches about Technical Drawing and Computer.

Zamboanga National High School West Hymn
I
In Zamboanga City there's a school in
the west
That stands proudly along by the sea
Where the breezes blow to make us
feel fresh you know
And the pure air comes in abundantly

II
In the year 86 that was June 30
When we did come to occupy its hall to
mark
Its foundation day with less a thousand
then
Who had eagerly move its stone till dark

III
Zamboanga West City high school, hail!
We gloryfy with love and care
Come and join today the gallant way

IV
We the westerners we are happy to
have
A good school like this one by the sea
We shall then join hands and hearts to
keep the torch
Of this beautiful school by the sea

(Repeat III & IV)

Schools in Zamboanga City